Ellis Park Stadium (known as Emirates Airline Park for sponsorship reasons) is a rugby union and association football stadium in the city of Johannesburg, Gauteng Province, South Africa. It hosted the final of the 1995 Rugby World Cup, which was won by the country's national team, the Springboks. The stadium was the country's most modern when it was upgraded in 1982 to accommodate almost 60,000 people. Today, the stadium hosts both football and rugby and is also used as a venue for other large events, such as open-air concerts. It has become synonymous with rugby as the only time when rugby was not played at Ellis Park was during 1980 and 1981, when the stadium was under construction during the upgrade.

The stadium was originally named after Mr J.D. Ellis, who made the area for the stadium available. A five-year ZAR 450 million (US$58 million/£30 million) naming rights deal was signed in 2008 with The Coca-Cola Company, resulting in the stadium being named Coca-Cola Park between 2008 and 2012.

League, provincial, and international football games have all been played at the stadium, and it has seen such teams as Brazil, Manchester United and Arsenal play. Ellis Park Stadium is the centerpiece of a sporting sector in the south-east of Johannesburg, where it neighbours Johannesburg Stadium (athletics), Standard Bank Arena, Ellis Park Tennis Stadium, and an Olympic-class swimming pool.

Ellis Park is home to the following teams:
 Lions (Cats until September 2006), United Rugby Championship.
 Golden Lions, Currie Cup domestic rugby competition

Cricket matches were held at the stadium in the past. Ellis Park hosted six Test matches between 1948 and 1954, but it has not been used for first-class cricket since New Wanderers Stadium opened in 1956 and is now only used for rugby and football.

History
In 1889 when after a long and hard-fought battle the Transvaal Rugby Football Union (now the Golden Lions Rugby Union) was formed and established a domain. The first games were played at the Wanderers Club's stadium whose grounds were situated where Johannesburg Park Station is today. Rows between the different rugby clubs as well as the Wanderers Club's claim of the field for the use of cricket games, forced the Transvaal Rugby Football Union to look for an alternative.

An area with a quarry and garbage dumps in Doornfontein was identified in, 1927 as the possible alternative. On 10 October 1927 the final rental agreement was signed. A quote of £600 was accepted for the grass and with a loan from the city council to the amount of £5,000, the building of the new stadium could commence. The stadium was built in eight months and in June 1928 the first test was played against the All Blacks. Thus was born Ellis Park which became internationally renowned and synonymous with rugby. Crowds of between 38,000 and a record crowd of 95,000 against the British and Irish Lions (in 1955) attended the matches.

Ellis Park played the host for cricket matches after an agreement was reached between Transvaal Rugby Football Union and The Transvaal Cricket Union. From 1947 when the cricket pitch was laid until 1956, Ellis Park was host to various cricket matches with the final games played in the 1953/54 series against New Zealand. Cricket then moved to its new venue where the current Wanderers still is today.

On 28 April 1969 the Transvaal Rugby Football Union formed a stadium committee to investigate the possibilities of a new stadium since the one in use did not meet all the modern requirements. Fifteen years later, after the game between Transvaal and the World Team on 31 March 1979, the old Ellis Park was demolished. Games were played at the Wanderers while the stadium was being rebuilt.

A new Transvaal Rugby Football Union management was elected in 1984 with Dr Louis Luyt as Chairman and Prof Joe Poolman as his deputy. The decision was taken to place Ellis Park Stadium under the management of a trust. In 1987 after the Ellis Park Stadium was listed on the stock exchange and due to sound financial management by Dr Luyt, Ellis Park could announce that the debt to the amount of R53 million was fully paid and a further 86 suites could be erected.

Today the Golden Lions Rugby Union (Transvaal Rugby Union before) and Ellis Park Stadium (Pty) Ltd are debt free and have cash resources of more than all the other Unions and South African Rugby Union combined as well as borrowing powers of a similar amount.

In 2005 Ellis Park made history by becoming the first black-owned stadium in South Africa. The Golden Lions Rugby Football Union passed the management of the Ellis Park Precinct to a company with 51% black ownership. Interza Lesego and Ellis Park Stadium (Pty) Ltd make up the new management of the Ellis Park Precinct.

The stadium was witness to an incident during a Premier Soccer League football match between Orlando Pirates and Black Leopards on 17 January 2007, when high winds blew several sideline advertising boards onto the pitch, striking a linesman and three players. Play resumed 7 minutes later, but the match was ultimately abandoned 6 minutes before full-time due to sudden torrential rains and lightning. The game's kickoff previously had been delayed 15 minutes by a power failure.

Disaster of 11 April 2001

In 2001 a stampede occurred during a soccer game between Orlando Pirates and Kaizer Chiefs. With 43 people killed, the Ellis Park Stadium disaster is to date the biggest of its kind in South Africa.

Concerts

On 12 January 1985, Ellis Park Stadium was the venue for Concert in the Park, a benefit concert organised by Hilton Rosenthal. 22 artists played the benefit, which raised money for Operation Hunger, a South African non-profit organisation.

Among the touring artists who have performed at the Stadium are:

Whitney Houston's concert was recorded and released as a home video titled: Whitney: The Concert for a New South Africa). A year later also Roxette's concert during the Crash! Boom! Bang! World Tour was recorded and released on VHS home video.

Sporting events

1995 Rugby World Cup 

In 1995, South Africa hosted the Rugby World Cup, and the final was held at Ellis Park on 24 June in front of 65,000 spectators. South Africa beat New Zealand 15–12 in extra time.

2009 FIFA Confederations Cup 
Ellis Park was one of the host venues for the 2009 FIFA Confederations Cup.

2010 FIFA World Cup 

Ellis Park hosted five group games, one second-round game and one quarter-final of the 2010 FIFA World Cup, for which its capacity was increased by 5,000 seats on the northern side only, to 62,000. Areas like the Presidential suite also received a facelift. There was also a hospitality room and new changing rooms. The total cost of renovations was R500 million and were completed in June 2008, two years before the World Cup.

Construction 

  More than 30,000 square metres of concrete was poured into the structure's shutters.
  More than 4,500 tons of reinforcement was used in the floor area of 48,000 square metres – and this does not include the seating areas.
  Nearly 500,000 pockets of cement went into the work done over 3.2 million man hours.
  There are about 3.1 million bricks laid at the stadium, 1,372 windows of various sizes, more than 4.1 km of handrails and a total of 70 km piping for chairs.
 There are fifty 200-watt speakers, thirty 30-watt speakers and 245 speakers clustered around the stadium.

Cricket Records

Test centuries
A total of 13 Test match centuries were scored on the ground.

Test match five-wicket hauls
Eight five-wicket hauls were taken in Test matches on the ground.

See also 
 List of Test cricket grounds
 List of stadiums in South Africa
 Ellis Park Stadium Disaster
 Orlando Pirates FC
 Johannesburg Stadium
 Soccer City

Notes

References

External links 
 
 
 360° view at In3sixty.com
Photos of Stadiums in South Africa at cafe.daum.net/stade

Sports venues completed in 1928
Cricket grounds in South Africa
Soccer venues in South Africa
Rugby union stadiums in South Africa
Rugby World Cup stadiums
2010 FIFA World Cup stadiums
2009 FIFA Confederations Cup stadiums
Sports venues in Johannesburg
Coca-Cola buildings and structures
Test cricket grounds in South Africa
Multi-purpose stadiums in South Africa
1928 establishments in South Africa